Mozambique participated at the 2018 Summer Youth Olympics in Buenos Aires, Argentina from 6 October to 18 October 2018.

Competitors

Athletics

Beach volleyball

Mozambique had 2 teams; a boys' and a girls'.

Canoeing

Mozambique was given one boat to compete by the tripartite committee.

 Girls' C1 - 1 boat

References

You
Nations at the 2018 Summer Youth Olympics
Mozambique at the Youth Olympics